119 Squadron or 119th Squadron may refer to:
 No. 119 (Netherlands East Indies) Squadron RAAF, a unit of the Royal Australian Air Force
 No. 119 Squadron RAF, a unit of the United Kingdom Royal Air Force
 119th Fighter Squadron, a unit of the United States Air Force
 119th Command and Control Squadron, a unit of the United States Air Force
 119 Squadron (Israel), the Israeli Air Force "Bat" Squadron

See also
 119th Division (disambiguation)
 119th Battalion
 119th Company